Patty Fendick and Jill Hetherington were the defending champions and won in the final 6–4, 6–4 against Elizabeth Smylie and Janine Tremelling.

Seeds
Champion seeds are indicated in bold text while text in italics indicates the round in which those seeds were eliminated.

 Patty Fendick /  Jill Hetherington (champions)
 Elizabeth Smylie /  Janine Tremelling (final)
 Belinda Cordwell /  Jo Durie (semifinals)
 Lea Antonoplis /  Kathleen Horvath (first round)

Draw

References
 1989 Nutri-Metics Open Doubles Draw

WTA Auckland Open
1989 WTA Tour